Jimmy Hitchcock (1911–1959) was an American football and baseball player.

James, Jim or Jimmy Hitchcock may also refer to: 

 Jimmy Hitchcock (cornerback) (born 1970), National Football League player  
 Jimmy Hitchcock (golfer) (1930–2015), English golfer
 Ripley Hitchcock (1857–1918), American editor, born James Ripley Wellman Hitchcock